The X200 class were a class of rail tractors introduced in 1963 and operated by the New South Wales Government Railways of Australia. They were a development of the smaller and less numerous X100 class. The X200 class remained in service until 1990 when they were either withdrawn or sold off to private companies, and some remain operational today.

Mark 1 series
The Mark 1 series of the X200 class were 3 times more powerful and twice as heavy as the X100 class. Six examples were built and numbered X201-X206.

They were built using a number of steam locomotive spare parts. They were built on the inner bogies of the AD60 Beyer-Garratt class locomotives, and used spare C36 class locomotive windows in their cabs. The rounded shapes of the hoods and cab gave it a baby-brother appearance to the main line 42 and 44 classes. The addition of a train brake allowed them to be run on the main line and also to be used as replacements for various ageing shunting locomotives. X201 was the first of the class entering service in December 1963. The six Mark 1s were initially used in the Sydney metropolitan network, but did later find their ways beyond this region.

Mark 2 series
The Mark 2 series of the X200 class were different again. Twelve examples were built and numbered X207-X218.

They were built on the outer bogies of the AD60 Beyer-Garratt class locomotives. This made them more practical for light line use. One was even rostered on to the Yass Tramway, previously the domain of the Z13 class tank locomotives. The Z13 class were called back to Yass during periods after the X-200 failed due to transmission faults. The exterior design of the Mark 2 was squarer, giving it the appearance of a baby-brother to the 49 class diesel locomotives.

The first six were built in 1967. The second six being an additional order, were placed into traffic from May 1968, with the final member of the class entering service in December 1968. This was more powerful than many of the typical small and workshop steam shunting locomotives of the time.

Summary
The X200 class must be considered largely successful, as they began to replace the various ageing steam shunting locomotives in various depots of the time. They were cleaner, more efficient to run, requiring less maintenance, and also giving locomotive crews more comfortable working conditions. Another indicator of the class' success is that several examples are still operational even today, at an age of around 45 years. Unfortunately, with the volatile and ever-changing nature of rail transport companies in the modern day, it is hard to keep a 100% accurate listing of their current owners and operational areas.

There is a certain amount of confusion with the numbering in this class. The numbers specified above apply to the class when first issued to traffic. In later years a certain amount of number-swapping was carried out by workshops. The biggest confusion being X101 and X212 swapping numbers, being two completely different types of locomotive! X217 and X218 later became X117 and X118, confusing the matter further. It appears that members of the X200 class were indiscriminately re-numbered into the X100 series. Many other renumberings exist. For the purposes of research it is often easier to refer to individual locomotives by their numbers when first issued to traffic and to note any number changes in brackets as below.

Remaining examples

Preserved
X204 (now X104) and X214 are at the Dorrigo Steam Railway & Museum
X203 at the Australian Railway Historical Society Yass Railway Museum
X206 at Transport Heritage NSW's Valley Heights Locomotive Depot Heritage Museum, operational for fire ban days and shunting purposes.
X213 belongs to the Coffee Pot Group
X215 (now X115) and X217 is preserved by the Richmond Vale Railway Museum with X217 operational at Richmond Main after having a cosmetic restoration by volunteers. X215 remains stored in an un-operational state at Rothbury.
Dorrigo Steam Railway and Museum owns all 3 examples of the X100/X200, the only place where all 3 types are preserved.  Dorrigo owns X102, X204 (1st series) and X214 (second series).

References

Further reading

B locomotives
Diesel locomotives of New South Wales
Railway locomotives introduced in 1963
Standard gauge locomotives of Australia